Michael Sheldon (born 4 November 1960) is  a former Australian rules footballer who played with Essendon in the Victorian Football League (VFL).

Notes

External links 		
		
Michael Sheldon's profile at Essendonfc.com

		
Living people		
1960 births		
		
Australian rules footballers from Victoria (Australia)		
Essendon Football Club players